Fabio Medina is a fictional superhero appearing in American comic books published by Marvel Comics. He previously went by the codename Goldballs, but has changed to Egg following changes in the X-Men during the "Dawn of X" relaunch. The character is depicted usually as a member of the X-Men or as a supporting character in stories featuring the Miles Morales version of Spider-Man.

Fictional character biography
Fabio Medina is a teenaged mutant whose powers first appear when he was the victim of an attempted robbery on the streets of San Diego. After manifesting his abilities, the bouncing balls emanating from his body frighten onlookers, and he is taken into custody by the San Diego Police Department. However, Cyclops and his group of X-Men arrive just in time to rescue him. A squad of different-sized Sentinels attack the new mutant and Cyclops's team, who managed to destroy the Sentinels. Fabio is then invited to join the X-Men when they departed San Diego. Although Fabio is reluctant, he decides to follow them. Fabio then joins the X-Men during their visit to Eva Bell's home and the encounter with the Avengers, before being dragged into limbo during Dormammu's attempt to kill them. In the aftermath, Fabio demands to be taken home, where his family questions his disappearance and is befuddled at his claims of being a mutant.

When S.H.I.E.L.D. agent Alison Blaire (Dazzler) arrives and questions him about Cyclops's location, Fabio loses control of his powers. He is taken into S.H.I.E.L.D. custody but is again rescued by Cyclops' team and rejoins them. He later assists in the battle against the Blockbuster Sentinel by concentrating the emission of his gold balls to topple them. He then assumes the mutant nickname "Goldballs".

After many adventures under the guidance of Illyana Rasputin and Shadowcat, Goldballs and his teammates express uncertainty about continuing as students anymore.

Goldballs next appears in Spider-Man, where he is seen attending Brooklyn Visions Academy, where he becomes the classmate of Ganke Lee and  Miles Morales, aka the second Spider-Man.

During the "House of X and Powers of X" storyline, Fabio would make his home on the new mutant homeland of Krakoa where the true nature of his seemingly mundane mutant powers would be revealed. Working in conjunction with Proteus, Elixir, Tempus and Hope Summers, he uses them to resurrect Cyclops, Jean Grey, M, Nightcrawler, Warren Worthington III, Husk, Mystique and Wolverine under X's instruction. After becoming a member of The Five, he changes his codename to "Egg".

During the "Judgment Day" storyline, Krakoa was attacked by Jack of Knives and those with him. Wolverine found that Egg was wounded by Jack of Knives before the attackers retreated.

Powers and abilities

Goldballs is a mutant with the superhuman ability to project at high-speed gold-colored non-viable ball-shaped eggs made of an unknown substance and of different sizes from any part of his body, which can be used as a concussive weapon. Goldballs can summon an infinite number of them, which are able to bounce, emitting a "poink" sound when they hit something. If he concentrates, he can project them in a straight line or direct them to a specific area. Normally the balls can be reabsorbed into his body, though when Goldballs is calm, he can cause them to disappear. It is later revealed that his abilities, while relatively unimpressive, have the capacity for vast genetic application. The golden spheres made from his own biological matter are a kind of nonviable unfertilized egg. Working as a unit with the mutants Proteus (who makes the eggs viable), Elixir (who brings the eggs with introduced DNA to life), Eva Bell (who speeds the incubation process), and Hope Summers (who links and enhances their abilities), Egg becomes a crucial part of rebirthing deceased mutants using their preserved DNA.

References

Further reading

Marvel Comics mutants